David Miller De Witt (November 25, 1837 – June 23, 1912) was an American lawyer and politician who served one term as a U.S. Representative from New York from 1873 to 1875.

Early life and family 
Born in Paterson, New Jersey, he was the son of Moses Edwards and Lydia Ann (Miller) DeWitt. His father was from Rosendale, New York and his mother from Hunterdon County, New Jersey. His father was a merchant who had moved to New Jersey around 1823 or 1824. His first wife, whom he married October 4, 1826 in Paterson, New Jersey, was Margaret Salome Goetschius (1791-1833), who was also an Ulster County native and was his third cousin. They had two children, Charles DuBois DeWitt and Catherine DeWitt.

His father married a second time, to Lydia, on September 8, 1835 in Clinton, New Jersey. Lydia was the daughter of David and Elizabeth (Welsh) Miller, and younger sister of United States Congressman from New Jersey Jacob W. Miller. David was the oldest of the children born to Moses and Lydia, with his younger full siblings being William Cantine DeWitt, John Henry DeWitt, Thomas DeWitt and Elizabeth DeWitt.

De Witt moved to New York in 1845 with his parents, who settled in Brooklyn. As a youth, De Witt attended the public schools of Brooklyn, a select school at Saugerties, and the local academy at Kingston.

Schooling and Law Career
He was graduated from Rutgers College, New Brunswick, New Jersey, in 1858, where he studied law.
De Witt was admitted to the bar in 1858 and commenced practice in Kingston, New York.
Principal of New Paltz Academy (later a State normal school) in 1861 and 1862.
He served as district attorney of Ulster County 1863–1870.
He was an unsuccessful candidate for reelection.

Congress 
De Witt was elected as a Democrat to the Forty-third Congress (March 4, 1873 – March 3, 1875).
He was not a candidate for renomination.

Later career and death 
He resumed the practice of law and also engaged in literary pursuits, including The Judicial Murder of Mary E. Surratt (1895), The Assassination of Abraham Lincoln (1898), and The impeachment and Trial of Andrew Johnson (1903).
From 1878 to 1881, he served as assistant corporation counsel of Brooklyn, New York
He was a member of the New York State Assembly (Ulster Co., 2nd D.) in 1883.
Corporation counsel of Kingston in 1884.
Surrogate of Ulster County from November 20, 1885, to December 31, 1886.

He again engaged in the practice of law.

He died in Kingston, New York, June 23, 1912 and was interred in Wiltwyck Rural Cemetery in Kingston.

Personal life
On April 10, 1867, De Witt married Mary Antoinette MacDonald (1844-1923) in New Brunswick, New Jersey. She was the daughter of Richard MacDonald (1803-1894), who served as mayor of New Brunswick from 1863 to 1865. David and Mary had four sons: 
Richard De Witt (1871-1903)
William Cantine De Witt (1873-1951); served as the Ulster County Clerk from 1913 to 1916
David Miller De Witt Jr. (1876-1918)
Macdonald De Witt (1878-1967); graduated in 1901 from New York Law School, and was active as a lawyer in Kingston, New York. He was instrumental in the establishment of SUNY Ulster, and the library there is named for him

De Witt's grandfather, John Charles DeWitt (1755-1833), was a New York State Assemblyman for several terms and the town supervisor of Hurley, New York multiple times. His great-grandfather was Charles DeWitt; he is also a distant cousin of New York Governor DeWitt Clinton through the DeWitt family, as well as a descendant of Louis DuBois.

His uncle, Matthew Cantine DeWitt, served as Marbletown, New York town supervisor in 1843; his uncle, William Henry Romeyn (who married his aunt Mary Margaret DeWitt) was postmaster of Kingston, New York from 1849 to 1853. His first cousin was George Macculloch Miller.

See also

References

External links
 
 
 
 
 

1837 births
1912 deaths
Rutgers University alumni
Democratic Party members of the New York State Assembly
County district attorneys in New York (state)
Democratic Party members of the United States House of Representatives from New York (state)
Politicians from Kingston, New York
19th-century American politicians
Politicians from Paterson, New Jersey